Eduards is a Latvian masculine given name, which is a cognate of the English name Edward, meaning "rich guard". The name may refer to:

Eduards Berklavs (1914–2004), Latvian politician
Eduards Freimanis (1919–1993), Latvian footballer 
Eduards Kalniņš (1876–1964), Latvian general and politician
Eduards Smiļģis (1886–1966), Latvian actor and theatre director
Eduards Veidenbaums (1867–1892), Latvian writer
Eduards Višņakovs (born 1990), Latvian footballer

See also
Eduard (name)

References

Latvian masculine given names